Impressive is the seventeenth studio album by Japanese jazz fusion band T-Square, releasead on April 22, 1992.

Track listing

References

T-Square (band) albums
1992 albums